Dori may refer to:

Places
 Dori, Burkina Faso, a city
 Dori Department
 Roman Catholic Diocese of Dori
 Dori Airport
 Dori River, in Afghanistan and Pakistan
 Dori, Dharwad, India, a village

People

Given name, nickname or stage name
 Dori of Yejju (died 1831), a chief of one of the tribes of the Oromo people in Ethiopia
 Dori Arad (born 1982), Israeli footballer
 Dori Caymmi (born 1943), Brazilian singer, guitarist, songwriter, arranger and producer
 Dori Dorika (1913–1996), Russian-born Italian actress born Dorotea Massa
 Izidor Kürschner (ca. 1885-1940), Hungarian footballer
 Dori J. Maynard (born 1958), President of the Robert C. Maynard Institute for Journalism Education in Oakland, California
 Dori Monson (1961-2022), American radio personality
 Dorielton Gomes Nascimento (born 1990), Brazilian footballer
 Dori Parra de Orellana (1923-2007), Venezuelan politician
 Teodora Ruano (born 1969), Spanish retired racing cyclist
 Dori Seda (1951-1988), artist
 Dori Sanders (born 1934), African-American novelist and food writer

Last name
 Dov Dori (born 1953), Israeli-American computer scientist
 Franco Dori (1943–1987), Italian footballer
 Leonora Dori (1571–1617), a favourite of Queen Marie de Médici of France; executed for witchcraft
Sandro Dori (1938-2021), Italian actor
 Yaakov Dori (1899-1973), first Chief of Staff of the Israel Defense Forces

Fictional or mythological characters
 One of the dwarves in the Old Norse poem Völuspá
 Dori (Middle-earth), a Dwarf of J. R. R. Tolkien's legendarium
 Dori and Gura, twin archers serving under Oboro in the anime and manga series Utawarerumono
 Rainbow Girl (Dori Aandraison), a DC Comics heroine
 Dori Duz, a minor character in the novel Catch-22 by Joseph Heller
 Dori,, a character in the role-playing video game Genshin Impact

Other uses
 , a cargo liner in service from 1965 to 1967

See also 
 Dory (disambiguation)
 Dorie (disambiguation)
 Doris (disambiguation)

Lists of people by nickname